Lewis Glacier is in Wenatchee National Forest in the U.S. state of Washington and is  southeast of Black Peak. Lewis Glacier is located on the north flank of Corteo Peak just east of the border of North Cascades National Park and has a pronounced terminal moraine now well below the current terminus of the glacier.

See also
List of glaciers in the United States

References

Glaciers of the North Cascades
Glaciers of Skagit County, Washington
Glaciers of Washington (state)